Choristostigma perpulchralis is a moth in the family Crambidae. It is found in Mexico (Tehuacan, Veracruz) and the United States, where it has been recorded from New Mexico and Texas.

The wingspan is 18–22 mm. The forewings are bright yellow with a bright pink costa and terminal area, as well as a pink antemedial line. The hindwings are white and the terminal area is yellowish suffused with pink scales. Adults are on wing in March, May and September.

References

Moths described in 1899
Spilomelinae